Empire II: The Art of War is a video game developed by American studio White Wolf Productions and published by New World Computing for the PC.

Gameplay
Empire II: The Art of War is built around a highly customisable game and ruleset editor, allowing single battle scenarios to be created and played in eras from the Neolithic to the Space Age. It comes with a number of preset scenarios, including the Battle of Arbela (331 BC), the Battle of Lepanto (1571), the Battle of Blenheim (1704), and the American Civil War battles of Antietam and Shiloh (1862).

Development

Reception

PC Gamer reviewed the game, giving it 63%, praising it as "the most powerful, flexible, wargame construction set ever published", but ultimately criticizing how complex and badly documented it was, calling the game overall "one of the biggest disappointments in years". Next Generation also reviewed the PC version of the game, rating it two stars out of five, and stated that "The bottom line? Empire is a great game. Empire II can only be described as a disappointment." Computer Game Review dubbed the game a "solid job on a project of this magnitude."

Reviews
Level #31 (in Czech)
Computer Gaming World (Dec, 1995)
PC Player - Nov, 1995

References

External links
Empire II: The Art of War at MobyGames

1995 video games
Computer wargames
DOS games
Turn-based strategy video games
Video games developed in the United States
Windows games